"Dream" (also known as "I Can Dream") is a song by Irish boy band Boyzone. It was released on 15 June 2018 as the lead single for the band's sixth album, Thank You & Goodnight.

Background
On 1 May 2018, the band announced that they will release the sixth and final album to celebrate the band's 25 years journey in music. Following the announcement of the album, they also announce the release of the song from the album, titled: "I Can Dream", which was released on 15 June 2018. The song also contains Stephen Gately's vocals. Gately previously recorded a solo version of the song as the b-side to the single "Stay" (2001). When the song's original producer, Pete Kirtley, found the old DAT-recording containing "I Can Dream", he sent it to Boyzone's label. The band decided to re-record the song adding their vocals to Gately's version, thus including their late co-member of Boyzone in their last ever studio album. Boyzone re-wrote some of the lyrics and Keith Duffy said they turned it into "a song reminiscing about us back in the 1990s".

Music video
A lyric video for the song was also released on the band's YouTube official account on 15 June 2018. Images of the band when they were young which contains Stephen Gately's images was also used in the video.

Track listing
 Digital download
 "Dream" – 3:21

Release history

References

2018 singles
Boyzone songs
2010 songs
Songs written by Keith Duffy
Songs written by Michael Graham (singer)
Songs written by Ronan Keating
Songs written by Shane Lynch
Songs written by Stephen Gately
Songs written by Tim Hawes
Songs written by Pete Kirtley